Abbas Akbar is a Singaporean filmmaker, screenwriter and actor, predominantly working on Tamil films and television shows.

Early life and education
Akbar's mother is from Chidambaram district in Tamil Nadu and his father is from Tiruvannamalai, Tamil Nadu. He is the second out of three sons. His younger brother, Shabir, is a singer, songwriter and musician and the winner of the competition Vasantham Star 2005.

Career
Akbar made the short film Certain Chapters. Certain Chapters was nominated 'Best Short Film' at the Asian Festival of First Films and was screened at several international film festivals such as Kathmandu International Mountain Film Festival, 3rd New Jersey Independent South Asian Cinefest and the Stepping Stone Film Festival in Chennai.

His music videos produced by High Breed Media for Shabir is the first independent Tamil content to be playing on MTV Asia (both broadcast & online) and other international channels such as Channel [V] AMP, Go! Channel Philippines, DirectTV US and Mobile TV – Vodafone UK / Ireland.

He was also one of the two directors for the award-winning drama series Vettai (TV series) that took Singapore Tamil viewers by storm. Cop drama Vettai: Pledged to Hunt took home a slew of awards at Pradhana Vizha 2011, Mediacorp Vasantham's annual awards show honouring the best in the local television industry.

In 2014, it was reported that Akbar is directing a film called Chennai2Singapore by Media Development Authority (Singapore) and Comicbook Films India.

Honors and awards
The Singapore Police Force in celebration of the Home Team National Day Observance Ceremony on 6 August 2012 awarded Akbar with a Public Spiritedness Award from Minister in Prime Minister's Office and 2nd Minister for Home Affairs and Trade and Industry Mr. S. Iswaran. This award was presented for his assistance rendered to a patrol officer in stopping an offender who attempted to escape.

Filmography

Television

References

Living people
Singaporean film directors
Year of birth missing (living people)
Singaporean people of Indian descent